Aldo Marazza (1912 – 11 September 1938) was an Italian voiturette racing driver, regarded as the most promising at the time.

Marazza was born in Milan, where he also died.

He won his first race, at the 1937 Circuito della Superba Voiturette race at Genoa, racing his privately owned Maserati 4CS (#1519), previously owned by Count Giovanni Lurani and Giuseppe Gilera.
In 1938 he was hired to race for Maserati, first in Sicilia, at the 1938 Targa Florio where he crashed his Maserati 6CM; he won the next at the 1938 Grand Prix of Naples.  At the 1938 Grand Prix of Milano he overturned the 6CM in the «Lesmo curve», pierced a lung and died the next day.

External links
forix.com

1912 births
1938 deaths
Racing drivers from Milan
Racing drivers who died while racing
Sport deaths in Italy